Miljan Radović (25 September 1933 – 15 June 2015) was a Yugoslav communist politician who served as President of the Presidency of the Central Committee of the League of Communists of Montenegro (SKCG) from 1986 to 1989. Radović resigned, along with numerous other SKCG officials, in the wake of the 1988–1989 anti-bureaucratic revolution.

See also
 League of Communists of Montenegro
 President of the League of Communists of Montenegro

References

1933 births
2015 deaths
League of Communists of Montenegro politicians
Central Committee of the League of Communists of Yugoslavia members
Montenegrin communists